Javed Burki (born 8 May 1938) is a Pakistani former cricketer who played in 25 Test matches from 1960 to 1969 to eventually become an ICC match referee.  Burki received his early education from Saint Mary's Academy at Rawalpindi.  He also played cricket while studying at Oxford University (1958–1960).

Javed Burki is the son of General Wajid Ali Khan Burki (1900–1988).  General Burki's sister-in-law, Shaukat Khanum (Burki), was the mother of Imran Khan, the former Prime Minister of Pakistan. Another of Burki's cousins, Majid Khan, also served as Pakistan's cricket captain.

Burki's brothers include Dr. Nausherwan Khan Burki, a founding member of the Shaukat Khanum Memorial Cancer Hospital & Research Centre, and Jamshed Burki, a career civil servant Interior Secretary.

After retiring from cricket, Burki joined the Pakistan Civil Service as part of the District Management Malakand Division – NWFP eventually working his way up to become Secretary to Government of Pakistan's Ministry of Commerce and Secretary Ministry of Water and Power (WAPDA). Burki also served as CEO of Pakistan Automobile Corporation (PACO) under whose leadership Pakistan's first locally assembled car company, the  Pak Suzuki Motor Company, was launched.

During the dictatorship of General Pervez Musharraf Burki objected to the questionable military vehicle procurement process by senior serving members of Pakistan's Army. To silence him, Burki and his partner Muzzamil Niazi were both arrested on 19 December 2002, in Islamabad and Lahore respectively, and taken to Karachi Central Jail.

References

1938 births
Living people
Pakistan Test cricketers
Aitchison College alumni
Pakistan Test cricket captains
Khyber Pakhtunkhwa cricketers
Pakistani cricketers
Pashtun people
Pakistan Universities cricketers
Oxford University cricketers
Pakistan Eaglets cricketers
Lahore A cricketers
Karachi Whites cricketers
Karachi Blues cricketers
Rawalpindi cricketers
Punjab (Pakistan) cricketers
Lahore Greens cricketers
Javed
St. Anthony's High School, Lahore alumni
Cricket match referees
Pakistani prisoners and detainees
Pakistan Cricket Board Presidents and Chairmen
Alumni of the University of Oxford